The 1952 Saskatchewan general election was held on June 11, 1952, to elect members of the Legislative Assembly of Saskatchewan.

The Co-operative Commonwealth Federation government of Premier Tommy Douglas was re-elected for a third term with an increased majority.

The Liberal Party of Walter Tucker increased its share of the popular vote to almost 40%, but lost 9 of the seats it had held in the previous legislature.

The Social Credit and Progressive Conservative parties continued to lose support.

This election was held using a mixture of single-member districts and multi-member districts. Regina elected three members. Saskatoon and Moose Jaw City elected two. Each voter could cast as many votes as there were seats to fill in the district (Block Voting). Each multi-member district elected a one-party sweep of the district's seats. There was no proportionality.

Results

Note: * Party did not nominate candidates in previous election.

See also
List of political parties in Saskatchewan
List of Saskatchewan provincial electoral districts

Saskatchewan
1952 in Saskatchewan
1952
June 1952 events in Canada